Folksongs and Instrumentals with Guitar is a 1958 album by American blues and folk musician Elizabeth Cotten and was released on Folkways Records as FG 3526. In 1989 it was reissued by Smithsonian Folkways as SFW40009 featuring Mike Seeger's updated notes with comments on Cotten's life, musical style, and song lyrics. The album is also known as Freight Train and Other North Carolina Folk Songs and Tunes and was originally released as Elizabeth Cotten: Negro Folk Songs and Tunes. It is best known for containing the earliest recording of her classic "Freight Train." The album cover was designed by Ronald Clyne.

In 2008, the Library of Congress named the album to its National Recording Registry as "culturally, historically, or aesthetically significant".

Track listing

References

1958 albums
Folkways Records albums
United States National Recording Registry recordings